Yanhu District is the main district of the city of Yuncheng, Shanxi province, China. Guan Yu's birthplace Xie county is located here.

Transportation 
Yuncheng railway station is located here.

References

External links
www.xzqh.org 

County-level divisions of Shanxi
Guan Yu